Connor Lemonheigh-Evans (born 24 January 1997) is a Welsh footballer who plays for Notts County on loan from Stockport County. He is a Wales under-21 international. He started his career at Bristol City and had loans at Bath City and Torquay United, before joining Torquay United for an undisclosed fee in August 2020.

Early career
Lemonheigh-Evans was born in Swansea.

Club career
Having been with Bristol City since 2012, Lemonheigh-Evans signed a professional contract with the club in May 2016. He joined Bath City on loan in January 2017, making his debut in a 1–1 draw at home to Hampton & Richmond Borough on 7 January. He made three appearances for Bath, but returned to Bristol City after suffering an injury. He signed an extension to his contract in summer 2017.

On 28 July 2017, Lemonheigh-Evans joined Bath City on a two-month loan. He scored his first goal for the club in their first game of the season; a late penalty in a 5–2 home defeat to Chippenham Town. He scored three goals in 6 league matches for Bath City. In January 2018, Lemonheigh-Evans made his senior debut for Bristol City playing 90 minutes in the 3–0 loss at Watford in the FA Cup. On 31 January 2018, he joined National League side Torquay United on loan until the end of the season. He made his debut for Torquay United on 3 February 2018 as a 76th minute substitute in a 3–1 victory over Barrow. He scored his first goal for the club on 2 April 2018 with a 25-yard strike after 68 minutes in a 2–1 victory at home to Woking. Across the 2017–18 season, he appeared in 15 league matches, scoring once, as Torquay were relegated to the National League South.

On 29 September 2018, he returned to Torquay United on loan until January 2020. He extended his loan until the end of the season on 31 December 2018. In January 2019, he signed a two-year contract extension with Bristol City, keeping him at the club until summer 2021. He appeared in 30 league matches for Torquay, scoring three goals, as they were promoted back to the National League.

On 2 August 2019, he again returned to Torquay United on a loan deal until January 2020. In January 2020, his loan was extended to the end of the season. He appeared in 22 league matches, scoring once.

He joined Torquay United permanently for an undisclosed fee in August 2020.

On 14 June 2022, Lemonheigh-Evans joined newly promoted League Two club Stockport County on a two-year deal. On 23 February 2023, Lemonheigh-Evans returned to the National League with league leaders Notts County on loan until end of season.

International career
Lemonheigh-Evans has represented Wales at youth and under 21 levels.

Career statistics

Honours
Torquay United
National League South: 2018–19 

Individual 
National League Team of the Year: 2020–21
Torquay United Player of the Year: 2020–21

References

External links

1997 births
Living people
Footballers from Llanelli
Welsh footballers
Association football midfielders
Bristol City F.C. players
Bath City F.C. players
Torquay United F.C. players
Stockport County F.C. players
Notts County F.C. players
National League (English football) players
English Football League players
Wales youth international footballers
Wales under-21 international footballers